John Cameron, 1st Lord Lochiel (1663–1747) was a prominent Scottish Jacobite, soldier, courtier and 18th Chief of the Clan Cameron. After the 1715 rising he was permanently exiled to France. 

The eldest son of Cavalier Sir Ewen Cameron of Lochiel, one of the first to join the 1652 Rising for King Charles II, by whose favour he was knighted in 1681, and his second wife Lady Isobel MacLean. He fought with his father at the Battle of Killiecrankie.  

Lord Lochiel joined the Earl of Mar's forces in the 1715 Jacobite rising as acting chief of Clan Cameron. During the 1719 Jacobite rising he fought at the Battle of Glen Shiel. After the 1719 Rising he returned to France and granted a generous pension by King James. He served at the Jacobite court in Avignon and later in Rome. Lord Lochiel died in 1747 at Nieuport, France. 

On 27 January 1717, he was made a Lord of Parliament by King James VIII and III, otherwise known as the "Old Pretender" or "Old Chevalier", in the Jacobite peerage.

Marriage and family 
Lord Lochiel married Isobel Campbell, daughter of Sir Alexander Campbell, 6th of Lochnell (1653–1713), a scion of the 3rd Earl of Argyll, and Margaret Stewart of Appin. 

His eldest son and successor was Donald Cameron of Lochiel (1695–1748) known as "Gentle Lochiel", who played an important role in the Jacobite rising of 1745. His third son, Dr Archibald Cameron, was the last Jacobite to be executed for treason in 1753.

See also 
 Lochiel
 Jacobitism

References

1663 births
1748 deaths
John
Scottish clan chiefs
17th-century Scottish landowners
Scottish Jacobites
Scottish soldiers
Knights Bachelor
Scottish expatriates in Belgium
Lochiel, John Cameron, 1st Lord
People of the Jacobite rising of 1719
18th-century Scottish landowners